The Zen-Nippon Nisai Yushun (全日本2歳優駿) is an internationally listed, Domestic Grade 1 flat horse race in Japan open to two-year-old horses. It is run at Kawasaki Racecourse over a distance of 1600 metres.

The race was first run in 1999 and is an important race in Japan for two-year-olds on dirt. In 2017, the race began to be included as part of the Road to the Kentucky Derby series.

Winners

See also 
Horse racing in Japan

References 

Horse races in Japan
Flat horse races for two-year-olds
Recurring sporting events established in 1999
Dirt races in Japan